In association football, the back-pass rule prohibits the goalkeeper from handling the ball in most cases when it is passed to them by a team-mate. It is described in Law 12, Section 2 of the Laws of the Game.

Award
Goalkeepers are normally allowed to handle the ball within their own penalty area, and once they have control of the ball in their hands opposition players may not challenge them for it. However the back-pass rule prohibits goalkeepers from handling the ball after it has been deliberately kicked to them by a team-mate, or after receiving it directly from a throw-in taken by a team-mate. Back-passes with parts of the body other than the foot, such as headers, are allowed. Despite the popular name "back-pass rule", there is no requirement in the laws that the kick or throw-in must be backwards; handling by the goalkeeper is forbidden regardless of the direction the ball travels.

The penalty for the offence is an indirect free kick. This is awarded from the position where the handling occurred, unless it is within the 6-yard goal area, in which the kick is taken from the point on the 6-yard line closest to the point of the offence.

Tricks to circumvent the rule
Goalkeepers are allowed to handle the ball if the ball is played back to them by an action other than a kick or throw-in (such as a header), but defenders are not permitted to attempt to use a deliberate trick to pass the ball to the goalkeeper with a part of the body other than the foot to circumvent the rule. This would include flicking the ball up with the foot and then heading the ball back to the goalkeeper, or heading a ball on the ground that would otherwise be regularly playable with the foot.

The United States Soccer Federation (USSF) has provided the following guidance to goalies about when they cannot use their hands on the ball in the penalty area:

History and impact
The back-pass rule was introduced in 1992 to discourage time-wasting and unduly defensive play after the 1990 World Cup was widely criticised as excessively dull, rife with back-passing and goalkeepers holding up the ball to waste time. During that tournament, in the Republic of Ireland versus Egypt match, Ireland goalkeeper Packie Bonner held the ball for nearly six minutes. The last tournament prior to the back-pass rule was UEFA Euro 1992, a tournament where eventual winners Denmark made frequent use of outfield players passing to their goalkeeper who held the ball to waste time. 

The first games played with the new rule were at the 1992 Summer Olympics. Early matches with the new rule resulted in some confusion in defences; indeed in the very first game Italy fell foul of the new rule and the United States were able to score after being awarded an indirect free kick 15 yards from goal.

In 1997, the back-pass rule was extended to prevent goalkeepers handling the ball when received directly from a team-mate's throw in.

A goal scored by FC Bayern Munich from an indirect free kick, awarded for a back-pass late in a game between them and Hamburger SV, was decisive in Bayern winning the 2000–01 Bundesliga.

The back pass rule is considered one of the most popular and successful rule changes in the modern game. As well as preventing dull play, it also required goalkeepers to become more proficient with playing the ball with the foot, and has been cited as the start of the evolution of the play-making "sweeper-keeper".

References

Laws of association football
Association football terminology
1992 in association football
1992 introductions